Mark L'vovich Kadin (born April 28, 1965) is a Russian conductor and musical director of Soviet origin.

Kadin has been the conductor of the Bulgarian National Radio Symphony Orchestra since 2017.

References

1965 births
Living people
People from Kramatorsk
21st-century Russian conductors (music)
Russian male conductors (music)
21st-century Russian male musicians